Heterarmia is a genus of moths in the family Geometridae described by Warren in 1895.

Species
Heterarmia buettneri (Hedemann, 1881)
Heterarmia dissimilis (Staudinger, 1897)
Heterarmia appositaria (Leech, 1897)

References

Boarmiini